Hebron is a town in Denton County in the U.S. state of Texas with a small disconnected section in Collin County. The population was 415 at the 2010 census.

History
Hebron was founded in the 1890s and was alternatively known as "Shepton". The land was donated by the Blackland Townsite Company, a subsidiary of the St. Louis and San Francisco Railroad. Historically, the town center was based near the intersection of two railroads, near present-day East Hebron Parkway and 1st Street. Much of that town center has been cleared and developed.

The town was first incorporated in 1961 as a method to prevent Plano and Carrollton from annexing the territory and imposing taxes. The city of Hebron imposed no taxes of its own, and when the time was ripe for a landowner to develop his land, he would ask the town to disannex that parcel. Now it comprises a few plots of land connected with narrow strips and easements, which confuses many maps. Stanley Dozier, the namesake of Dozier Road, was the only mayor of the town between 1961 and 1997. The town is currently managed by a three-person commission with Kelly Clem as the mayor.

Air Park-Dallas Airport was built as a public civilian airstrip within the city limits in 1965.

For the last 20 years, Hebron has disannexed large portions of its territory to be annexed by neighboring communities (Lewisville, The Colony, Carrollton, and Plano) instead. The original goal was for Hebron to disappear entirely as an incorporated community, but recently elected leaders have attempted to reverse the situation and allow Hebron to continue as a town. This is partially in response to the city of Carrollton's threatening not to maintain the water supply unless the town is annexed to Carrollton.

Geography

Hebron is located in southeastern Denton County at  (33.028460, –96.898564). A small, disconnected piece of the town is in southwestern Collin County.

Demographics

As of the census of 2000, there were 874 people, 271 households, and 243 families residing in the town. The population density was 214.8 people per square mile (82.9/km2). There were 335 housing units at an average density of 82.3 per square mile (31.8/km2). The racial makeup of the town was 82.27% White, 4.69% African American, 0.11% Native American, 11.33% Asian, 0.69% from other races, and 0.92% from two or more races. Hispanic or Latino of any race were 2.29% of the population.

There were 271 households, out of which 59.8% had children under the age of 18 living with them, 86.3% were married couples living together, 1.8% had a female householder with no husband present, and 10.3% were non-families. 8.1% of all households were made up of individuals, and 1.8% had someone living alone who was 65 years of age or older. The average household size was 3.23 and the average family size was 3.43.

In the town, the population was spread out, with 36.2% under the age of 18, 2.9% from 18 to 24, 41.9% from 25 to 44, 16.1% from 45 to 64, and 3.0% who were 65 years of age or older. The median age was 34 years. For every 100 females, there were 100.9 males. For every 100 females age 18 and over, there were 100.7 males.

The median income for a household in the town was $140,102, and the median income for a family was $140,371. Males had a median income of $93,983 versus $61,250 for females. The per capita income for the town was $42,598. None of the population or families were below the poverty line.

Education

The Lewisville Independent School District serves Hebron. Hebron High School is in Carrollton.

References

External links
Article at Handbook of Texas Online

Dallas–Fort Worth metroplex
Towns in Denton County, Texas
Towns in Collin County, Texas
Towns in Texas